Šaštín-Stráže is a town in the Senica District, Trnava Region in western Slovakia. Originally two separate villages, now it is one of the youngest towns in Slovakia, having received town privileges on 1 September 2001.

Etymology
The name "Šaštín" consists of two parts: šáš (šašina, šáchor, present also in other Slavic languages – a sedge) and týn (initially a fence, later also a small medieval fort). The name Stráže (guards) refers to a historic settlement of border guards.

Geography
The Myjava River flows through the town, dividing the town's two parts.

History

The first written mention about Šaštín-Stráže was in 1218. Although the town's two parts, Šaštín and Stráže nad Myjavou were for long two separate villages, their history is closely connected to each other. The villages merged in 1961 under name Šaštínske Stráže, changed in 1971 to the current name.

Demographics
According to the 2001 census, the town had 5,005 inhabitants. 95.44% of inhabitants were Slovaks, 2.06% Roma and 1.50% Czechs. The religious makeup was 88.45% Roman Catholics, 7.31% people with no religious affiliation, and 1.34% Lutherans.

Importance
Šaštín-Stráže is one of the most important Marian shrines in Slovakia. Several pilgrimages are held there annually, especially on Pentecost and Our Lady of Sorrows Day (15 September).

Twin towns – sister cities

Šaštín-Stráže is twinned with:
 Bełżyce, Poland
 Brody, Ukraine

References

External links

Official website 

Cities and towns in Slovakia
Catholic pilgrimage sites